HR College, Amnour also known as Hotilal Ramnath College is a degree college in Amnour, Bihar, India. It is a constituent unit of Jai Prakash University. The college offers three years degree course (TDC) in arts and science.

History 
The college was established in the year 1960.

Departments 
College offers bachelor's degree in following disciples.

 Arts
 Hindi
  English
 Economics
 Political Science
 History
 Psychology
 Science
 Mathematics
 Physics
 Chemistry
 Zoology
 Botany

References

External links 

 Jai Prakash University website 

Colleges in India
Constituent colleges of Jai Prakash University
Educational institutions established in 1960
1960 establishments in Bihar